Gerry Vincent (born c. 1934) was a Canadian football player who played for the Winnipeg Blue Bombers. He previously played for at Daniel McIntyre High School.

References

1930s births
Living people
Canadian football ends
Winnipeg Blue Bombers players
Players of Canadian football from Manitoba
Canadian football people from Winnipeg